Baños de Rioja is a village in the province and autonomous community of La Rioja, Spain.

Tourist attractions

Parish Church of Magdalena
Built of stone masonry, It was enlarged and modified between the 15th and 17th centuries.

Ermita del Pilar
Located two kilometers from the center of town center, across the Rio Oja.

Strong Tower
Built in the 13th century, and probably belonged to the lineage of the Lopez de Haro.

References

Populated places in La Rioja (Spain)